The Asramam Link Road is an important four-lane city road in Kollam in the Indian state of Kerala. This road was formerly known as  Airport Road or Aerodrome Road as it was the connection road to Kollam Airport, the one and only airport in the entire Kerala coast then. The road starts from Kappalandimukku near Polayathode in the east and currently ends at KSRTC, but is ultimately planned to extend to Thoppilkadavu in the west of the city. The Rs.114 crore worth third phase of construction includes a 3 km long flyover, which would extend it from Kollam KSRTC Bus Station to Thoppilkadavu, is going on now.

Importance

Kollam is an old sea port city in Kerala with traffic bottlenecks in three locations: Polayathode-Thattamala, Anchalumoodu and Kottiyam. Demand existed for a new road to bypass Downtown Kollam and avoid the complex Chinnakada Junction. The Kollam Bypass project is the least funded bypass project in the state and a  stretch remains unfinished. This link road now serves the city as a mini bypass by avoiding the heavy traffic at Chinnakada junction. The Kollam Development Authority had approved Rs. 1.6 Crores for the project's Phase-I. The road is also included in the JnNURM Mission for Kollam city.

Phase-I & II
The first two phases of Link road, Kappalandi Mukku-Kadappakada-Asramam Muneeswaran Kovil four-lane road was inaugurated on 14September 2010. The  road which was laid at a cost of Rs 15.21 Crore by the Kollam Municipal Corporation under the auspices of the Kerala Sustainable Urban Development Project and was inaugurated by the Co-operation Minister of Kerala, G. Sudhakaran.

Phase-III
As part of the Phase-III development, the present road would be extended to Thoppilkadavu at a cost of Rs.63 crore. The project comprises construction of a new bridge across the confluence of the Kollam Canal with the Ashtamudi Lake. On completion, the Asramam Link Road will enable those passing through Kollam to avoid the busy Collectorate-High School Junction-Taluk Office junction-Chinnakada and Railway station.

Major junctions
Kappalandimukku → Chemmanmukku → Kadappakada → Asramam → KSRTC → Thevally → Thoppilkadavu

See also

 Kollam
 Kollam Airport(Defunct)
 Asramam Maidan
 Polayathode
 Thoppilkadavu
 Kadappakada
 Kollam KSRTC Bus Station

References

Link Road